Powell Lindsay (19051987) was an actor, born in Philadelphia, Pennsylvania, on stage and film as well as a director and writer of theatrical productions in the United States. He's been described as the "muse of black social realism on film." He was friends with Langston Hughes and produced works highlighting the work of Hughes.

He was married to June Lindsey (1920-2013)

He died of cancer at home in Ann Arbor, Michigan on September 22, 1987.

Theater

Actor
 Tobacco Road (1950 revival)

Director
 Big White Fog (1940 rendition of Theodore Ward's play)
 Flight from Fear (1954) staged at Detroit’s Masonic Temple 
 This is Our America (1956)

Filmography
 That Man of Mine (1946)
 Jivin’ in Be-Bop (1946)
 Love in Syncopation (1946)
 Souls of Sin (1949)

References

External links 

 

1905 births
1987 deaths
Actors from Ann Arbor, Michigan
Deaths from cancer in Michigan
Male actors from Michigan
American theatre directors
American male film actors
American male stage actors
20th-century American male actors